Allan M. Learned was the interim head coach of the Virginia Tech Hokies football program during the closing portion of the 1950 season.  Previous head coach, Robert McNeish, having won only one game in his first two seasons, was fired during the 1950 season, and with Learned the Hokies finished 0-10. Frank Moseley took over the permanent position in 1951.

References

Virginia Tech Hokies football coaches
Year of birth missing
Possibly living people